Innsworth Meadow is a  biological Site of Special Scientific Interest in Gloucestershire, notified in 1979.

Location and use
The meadow overlies Lower Lias clays.  It is one example of a very small number of unimproved neutral
grasslands remaining in the Severn Vale near Innsworth and Twigworth.  It is used for the production of hay and stock grazing, and Natural England reports the status of this in September 2011.

Flora

The meadow is old ridge and furrow grassland which has been traditionally managed. The dominant grasses are Common Bent, Red Fescue, Crested Dog’s-tail and Yorkshire Fog. Flowering herbs include Cowslip, Pepper Saxifrage, Yellow-rattle, Ox-eye Daisy, Great Burnet, the Green-winged Orchid and Corky-fruited Water Dropwort.

There are thick Hawthorn hedges, with some Ash trees on three sides.

References

SSSI Source
 Natural England SSSI information on the citation
 Natural England SSSI information on the Innsworth Meadow unit

External links
 Natural England (SSSI information)

Sites of Special Scientific Interest in Gloucestershire
Sites of Special Scientific Interest notified in 1979
Meadows in Gloucestershire